Gwedna is a hamlet in the parish of Breage (where the 2011 census population was included ), Cornwall, England, UK.

References

Hamlets in Cornwall